Short Life of Barbara Monk is an album by the American jazz pianist Ran Blake featuring saxophonist Ricky Ford recorded in 1986 and released on the Italian Soul Note label. The album's dedicatee (1953–84) died from cancer and was the daughter of the jazz pianist Thelonious Monk.

Reception
The Penguin Guide to Jazz selected this album as part of its suggested Core Collection.

The Allmusic review by Scott Yanow awarded the album 3 stars stating "Tenor saxophonist Ricky Ford works surprisingly well with Blake, whose phrasing and use of space are unusual, while his interpretations are sometimes based on the feeling he gets from song titles rather than the chord changes... Another intriguing Ran Blake set".

Track listing
All compositions by Ran Blake except where noted.
 "I've Got You Under My Skin" (Cole Porter) - 3:37
 "Una Matica de Ruda" [Take 1] (Traditional) - 0:54
 "Artistry in Rhythm" (Stan Kenton) - 5:54
 "Una Matica de Ruda" [Take 2] (Traditional) - 0:58
 "In Between" (Claire Ritter) - 4:06
 "Short Life of Barbara Monk" - 7:24
 "Impresario of Death" - 3:45
 "23 Degrees North, 82 Degrees West" (Dee Barton) - 2:44
 "Dark" (Mauricio Villavecchia) - 4:49
 "Vradiazi" (Mikis Theodorakis) - 2:51
 "Pourquoi, Laurent?" - 4:31
Recorded at Blue Jay Recording Studios in Carlisle, Massachusetts on August 26, 1986

Personnel
Ran Blake – piano
Ricky Ford - tenor saxophone
Ed Felson - bass
Jon Hazilla - drums

References

Black Saint/Soul Note albums
Ran Blake albums
1986 albums